Gregory Hayman (born 21 December 1957) is an Australian former weightlifter. He competed in the men's flyweight event at the 1988 Summer Olympics.

References

External links
 

1957 births
Living people
Australian male weightlifters
Olympic weightlifters of Australia
Weightlifters at the 1988 Summer Olympics
Place of birth missing (living people)
Commonwealth Games medallists in weightlifting
Commonwealth Games silver medallists for Australia
Commonwealth Games bronze medallists for Australia
Weightlifters at the 1990 Commonwealth Games
20th-century Australian people
21st-century Australian people
Medallists at the 1990 Commonwealth Games